Sammy Charles White (July 7, 1927 – August 4, 1991) was a Major League Baseball catcher and right-handed batter who played with the Boston Red Sox (1951–59), Milwaukee Braves (1961) and Philadelphia Phillies (1962). He was a solid defensive catcher, with a good arm and the ability to get the most out of a Boston pitching staff that included Mel Parnell, Ellis Kinder, Bill Monbouquette, Mike Fornieles and Frank Sullivan.

White was born in Wenatchee, Washington. A college baseball player and All-American college basketball player at the University of Washington, he signed his first professional baseball contract with the Seattle Rainiers of the Pacific Coast League in 1949. After the 1949 minor league season ended, the Minneapolis Lakers asked White to join their National Basketball Association team. But the Red Sox, who had acquired White's contract during 1949, were furious and prevented White from doing that.

On June 11, 1952, White hit a ninth-inning grand slam off of Satchel Paige, turning a 9–7 deficit into an 11–9 walkoff victory over the St. Louis Browns. After rounding third base, White dropped to the ground and crawled to home, kissing the plate. An All-Star in 1953, White enjoyed his best season with the bat in 1954, hitting .282 with 14 home runs and 75 runs batted in (RBIs). In a May 1, 1955, game against the Cleveland Indians, White ruined Bob Feller's no-hitter with a single in the 7th inning. Feller posted a 2–0 shutout, and set a major league record with his 12th one-hitter in that game. After nine productive years in Boston, White was traded to the Cleveland Indians just before the outset of the 1960 season. But White balked at the trade (even though Cleveland was a pennant contender and the Red Sox were an also-ran at the time) and retired, sitting out the season. Granted his release, he played for the Braves in 1961, and finished his career with Philadelphia one year later, playing for a former Red Sox teammate, skipper Gene Mauch. In eleven seasons, he was a career .262 hitter with 66 homers and 421 RBIs in 1043 games.

During his career with the Red Sox, White was one of the players featured in the Norman Rockwell painting The Rookie.  He also opened a bowling alley, Sammy White's Brighton Bowl, a few miles from Fenway Park, and became a professional bowler.  After baseball, White moved to Hanalei, Hawaii, where he became a professional golfer for the Princeville organization.  He died in Princeville, Hawaii, at the age of 64.

Highlights
All-Star (1953)
Became the only 20th-century player to score three runs in one inning (against the Detroit Tigers, on June 18, 1953, when the Red Sox scored a modern major league record 17 runs in one inning)
Caught Mel Parnell's no-hitter on July 14, 1956

References

Further reading

External links
, or Encyclopedia of MLB catchers

1927 births
1991 deaths
American League All-Stars
American men's basketball players
Baseball players from Washington (state)
Boston Red Sox players
Louisville Colonels (minor league) players
Major League Baseball catchers
Milwaukee Braves players
Oneonta Red Sox players
People from Wenatchee, Washington
Philadelphia Phillies players
Roanoke Red Sox players
Scranton Red Sox players
Seattle Rainiers players
Washington Huskies baseball players
Washington Huskies men's basketball players